The Hour of Bewilderbeast is the debut studio album by British musician Badly Drawn Boy, released on 26 June 2000. Damon Gough, who performs as Badly Drawn Boy, wrote, produced, and played several instruments on the album's eighteen tracks, several of which also feature accompaniment by members of the British indie rock bands Alfie and Doves. The Hour of Bewilderbeast was released to great critical acclaim and went on to win the 2000 Mercury Prize, and has sold 455,000 copies in the United Kingdom as of September 2011.

Release
The cover art, designed by Andy Votel, is a collage loosely based on Leonardo da Vinci's drawing Vitruvian Man. For the American release of the album, the album's cover was altered to remove a photograph of American actor and director Woody Allen, which was unauthorized by the copyright owners of the photograph. In addition, the song "Magic in the Air" was re-recorded with new instrumental parts to replace a section of the song utilizing lyrics taken from the 1987 song "Love Is Contagious" by R&B singer Taja Sevelle, after Sevelle's publishing company BMG objected to the use of the lyrics.

Reception and legacy

The Hour of Bewilderbeast was met with widespread critical acclaim. On the review aggregate site Metacritic, the album holds a score of 78 out of 100, indicating "generally favorable reviews." Michael Hubbard of musicOMH felt that the album "deserves to do well for many more reasons than the act's name, excellent though it is", and that "a surprise is set loose with every track". Calling the album a "concise tour through the gentler side of British songwriting history", Brent DiCrescenzo of Pitchfork wrote that the varied instrumentation "[attaches] insect wings to the lovely songs" and concluded that with The Hour of Bewilderbeast, "Badly Drawn Boy proves what shallow saps American liberal arts majors can be behind a guitar." AllMusic's John Bush stated that Gough had written and produced "over a dozen excellent songs of baroque folk-pop for his album debut, and the many gems can't help but shine through all the self-indulgence", highlighting Gough's use of humour in his lyrics.

Alternative Press stated that The Hour of Bewilderbeast gives "as full a portrait as possible of Gough's musical and personal life," while David Browne, writing in Entertainment Weekly, called the album an "intimate hour that's far from bewildering." Pat Blashill of Rolling Stone compared Gough to Elliott Smith and Nick Drake and wrote that "like Drake, he's mastered the art of evoking melancholy without slathering on too much sentimentality." Robert Hilburn of the Los Angeles Times drew similar comparisons to Drake, while noting that Gough "never succumbs to Drake's sad solipsism, though, favoring an expansive reach emotionally and musically." In a more mixed assessment, Spins Barney Hoskyns wrote that "Gough's dewy little tunes are mere scribblings in the margins of alt-folk's dog-eared hook-book, while his too-cool-to-care singing is drip-dry dreary" and that The Hour of Bewilderbeast, when compared to Elliott Smith's Figure 8, makes Gough "look like an imposter."

The Hour of Bewilderbeast appeared on several year-end lists. Pitchfork ranked the album at number 18 on its list of the top 20 albums of 2000. NME ranked the album at number 4 on its list of the 50 best albums of 2000. In addition, the album received the 2000 Mercury Prize, a prize Gough was favoured to win. When Gough received the prize, he tossed the prize money on the ground and said: "I always assumed I was never going to win because good things don't happen to good people normally."

The album was also listed in the book 1001 Albums You Must Hear Before You Die.

Track listing

Personnel
Credits for The Hour of Bewilderbeast adapted from album liner notes.

 Badly Drawn Boy (Damon Gough) – vocals, acoustic guitar, electric guitar, piano, lead guitar, bass guitar, keyboards, drum machine, tambourine, handclaps, whistling, slide guitar, harmonica, Wurlitzer electric piano, lead keyboards, organ solo, drum machine organs, percussion, crash cymbal, vibraphone, xylophone, harp, string arrangement, sound effects
 Spencer Birtwhistle – drums
 Adrian Dacre – drums
 Jimi Goodwin – bass
 Clare Hewitt – backing vocals
 Sean Kelly – drums, handclaps
 Matt McGeever – cello, handclaps
 Sam Morris – bass, keyboards, French horn, handclaps
 Northern New Orleans Brass Band – horns

 Ian Rainford – handclaps
 Martin Rebelski – Wurlitzer electric piano, clavinet, keyboards
 Joe Robinson – drum programming, loops, theremin, effects, sound effects
 Derrick Santini – handclaps
 Ian Smith – drums, electric guitar, percussion, vibraphone, handclaps
 Paul Taylor – string arrangements
 Andy Votel – drum programming, effects, piano, keyboards, strings samples, samples
 Matt Wardle – piano, organ, synthesizer, keyboards, vocals
 Gary Wilkinson – keyboards, drum programming, sirens, noises
 Andy Williams – drums
 Jez Williams – electric guitar, slide guitar
 Sophie Williams – handclaps

Charts

Weekly charts

Year-end charts

References

External links
 Official website for Badly Drawn Boy

Badly Drawn Boy albums
2000 debut albums
XL Recordings albums
Mercury Prize-winning albums
Albums produced by Ken Nelson (British record producer)